Artūras Seja (born 17 March 1996) is a Lithuanian sprint canoeist.

He won K-1 200m silver in the 2018 European Championships and the 2018 World Championships.

References

External links
TheSports.org profile

Living people
1996 births
Lithuanian male canoeists
ICF Canoe Sprint World Championships medalists in kayak
European Games competitors for Lithuania
Canoeists at the 2019 European Games